Eureka Center is an unincorporated community in Eureka Township, Dakota County, Minnesota, United States. Nearby places also include Farmington and Elko New Market. The Eureka Town Hall is located in Eureka Center. The community had a station on the former Minneapolis, Northfield and Southern Railway.

See also
 Eureka Township

References

Unincorporated communities in Dakota County, Minnesota
Unincorporated communities in Minnesota